It remains a difficult medical challenge to prevent the sudden cardiac death of athletes, typically defined as natural, unexpected death from cardiac arrest within one hour of the onset of collapse symptoms, excluding additional time on mechanical life support. (Wider definitions of sudden death are also in use, but not usually applied to the athletic situation.) Most causes relate to congenital or acquired cardiovascular disease with no symptoms noted before the fatal event. The prevalence of any single, associated condition is low, probably less than 0.3% of the population in the athletes' age group, and the sensitivity and specificity of common screening tests leave much to be desired. The single most important predictor is fainting or near-fainting during exercise, which should require detailed explanation and investigation. The victims include many well-known names, especially in professional soccer, and close relatives are often at risk for similar cardiac problems.

Causes
The sudden cardiac deaths of 387 young American athletes (under age 35) were analyzed in a 2003 medical review:

While most causes of sudden cardiac death relate to congenital or acquired cardiovascular disease, an exception is commotio cordis, in which the heart is structurally normal but a potentially fatal loss of rhythm occurs because of the accident of timing of a blow to the chest. Its fatality rate is about 65% even with prompt CPR and defibrillation, and more than 80% without.

Age 35 serves as an approximate borderline for the likely cause of sudden cardiac death. Before age 35, congenital abnormalities of the heart and blood vessels predominate. These are usually asymptomatic prior to the fatal event, although not invariably so. Congenital cardiovascular deaths are reported to occur disproportionately in African-American athletes.

After age 35, acquired coronary artery disease predominates (80%), and this is true regardless of the athlete's former level of fitness.

Various performance-enhancing drugs can increase cardiac risk, though evidence has been inconclusive about their involvement in sudden cardiac deaths.

Genetics

Cardiomyopathies

Cardiomyopathies are generally inherited as autosomal dominants, although recessive forms have been described, and dilated cardiomyopathy can also be inherited in an X-linked pattern. Consequently, in addition to tragedy involving an athlete who succumbs, there are medical implications for close relatives. Among family members of index cases, more than 300 causative mutations have been identified. However, not all mutations have the same potential for severe outcomes, and there is not yet a clear understanding of how these mutations (which affect the same myosin protein molecule) can lead to the dramatically different clinical characteristics and outcomes associated with hypertrophic cardiomyopathy (HCM) and dilated cardiomyopathy (DCM).

Since HCM, as an example, is typically an autosomal dominant trait, each child of an HCM parent has a 50% chance of inheriting the mutation. In individuals without a family history, the most common cause of the disease is a "de novo" mutation of the gene that produces the β-myosin heavy chain.

Channelopathies
Sudden cardiac death can usually be attributed to cardiovascular disease or commotio cordis, but about 20% of cases show no obvious cause and remain undiagnosed after autopsy. Interest in these "autopsy-negative" deaths has centered around the "ion channelopathies". These electrolyte channels are pores regulating the movement of sodium, potassium and calcium ions into cardiac cells, collectively responsible for creating and controlling the electrical signals that govern the heart's rhythm. Abnormalities in this system occur in relatively rare genetic diseases such as Long QT syndrome, Brugada syndrome, and Catecholaminergic polymorphic ventricular tachycardia, all associated with sudden death.  Consequently, autopsy-negative sudden cardiac deaths (no physical abnormalities identified) may comprise a larger part of the channelopathies than previously anticipated.

Heritable connective tissue diseases

Heritable connective tissue diseases are rare, each disorder estimated at one to ten per 100,000, of which Marfan syndrome is the most common. It is carried by the FBN1 gene on chromosome 15, which encodes the connective protein fibrillin-1, inherited as a dominant trait. This protein is essential for synthesis and maintenance of elastic fibers. Since these fibers are particularly abundant in the aorta, ligaments, and the ciliary zonules of the eye, these areas are among the worst affected. Everyone has a pair of FBN1 genes and, because transmission is dominant, those who have inherited one affected FBN1 gene from either parent will have Marfan syndrome. Although it is most frequently inherited as an autosomal dominant, there is no family history in 25% of cases.

Recruiting practices aimed at attracting athletes who are unusually tall or who have an unusually wide arm span (characteristics of Marfan syndrome) can increase the prevalence of the syndrome within sports such as basketball and volleyball.

DNA testing
After a disease-causing mutation has been identified in an index case (which is not always accomplished conclusively), the main task is genetic identification of carriers within a pedigree, a sequential process known as "cascade testing". Family members with the same mutation may show different severities of disease, a phenomenon known as "variable penetrance". As a result, some may remain asymptomatic, with little lifelong evidence of disease. Nevertheless, their children remain at risk of inheriting the disorder and potentially being more severely affected.

Screening

Screening athletes for cardiac disease can be problematic because of low prevalence and inconclusive performance of various tests that have been used. Nevertheless, sudden death among seemingly healthy individuals attracts much public and legislator attention because of its visible and tragic nature.

As an example, the Texas Legislature appropriated US$1 million for a pilot study of statewide athlete screening in 2007. The study employed a combination of questionnaire, examination and electrocardiography for 2,506 student athletes, followed by echocardiography for 2,051 of them, including any students with abnormal findings from the first three steps. The questionnaire alone flagged 35% of the students as potentially at risk, but there were many false positive results, with actual disease being confirmed in less than 2%. Further, a substantial number of screen-positive students declined repeated recommendations for follow-up evaluation. (Individuals who are conclusively diagnosed with cardiac disease are usually told to avoid competitive sports.) It should be stressed that this was a single pilot program, but it was indicative of the problems associated with large-scale screening, and consistent with experience in other locations with low prevalence of sudden death in athletes.

Incidence
Sudden cardiac death occurs in approximately one per 200,000 young athletes per year, usually triggered during competition or practice. The victim is usually male and associated with soccer, basketball, ice hockey, or American football, reflecting the large number of athletes participating in these sustained and strenuous sports. For a normally healthy age group, the risk appears to be particularly magnified in competitive basketball, with sudden cardiac death rates as high as one per 3,000 annually for male basketball players in NCAA Division I. This is still far below the rate for the general population, estimated as one per 1,300–1,600 and dominated by the elderly. However, a population as large as the United States will experience the sudden cardiac death of a competitive athlete at the average rate of one every three days, often with significant local media coverage heightening public attention.

In the United States approximately 8 to 10 deaths per year can be attributed to sudden cardiac death in NCAA with overall rate of 1 per 43,000.

Notable cases

These athletes, with notable careers, experienced sudden cardiac death by age 40.

 Mohamed Abdelwahab, 22 (2006), soccer
 Gaines Adams, 26 (2010), Amer. football
 Jaouad Akaddar, 28 (2012), soccer
 Davide Astori, 31 (2018), soccer
 Víctor Hugo Ávalos, 37 (2009), soccer
 Heath Benedict, 24 (2008), Amer. football
 Hédi Berkhissa, 24 (1997), soccer
 Pedro Berruezo, 27 (1973), soccer
 Viktor Blinov, 22 (1968), ice hockey
 Gilbert Bulawan, 29 (2016), basketball
 J. V. Cain, 28 (1979), Amer. football
 Sékou Camara, 27 (2013), soccer
 Alexei Cherepanov, 19 (2008), ice hockey
 Mitchell Cole, 27 (2012), soccer
 Jason Collier, 28 (2005), basketball
 Hugo Cunha, 28 (2005), soccer
 Renato Curi, 24 (1977), soccer
 Alexander Dale Oen, 26 (2012), swimming
 Frankie de la Cruz, 37 (2021), baseball
 Shane del Rosario, 30 (2013), MMA
 Ben Idrissa Dermé, 34 (2016), soccer
 Lyle Downs, 24 (1921), Austral. football
 Patrick Ekeng, 26 (2016), soccer
 Bobsam Elejiko, 30 (2011), soccer
 Derrick Faison, 36 (2004), Amer. football
 Sebastian Faisst, 20 (2009), handball
 Miklós Fehér, 24 (2004), soccer
 Neil Fingleton, 36 (2017), basketball
 Marc-Vivien Foé, 28 (2003), soccer
 Matt Gadsby, 27 (2006), soccer
 Hank Gathers, 23 (1990), basketball
 Cristian Gómez, 27 (2015), soccer
 Michael Goolaerts, 23 (2018), cycling
 Larry Gordon, 28 (1983), Amer. football
 Herb Gorman, 28 (1953), baseball
 Rasmus Green, 26 (2006), soccer
 Sergei Grinkov, 28 (1995), figure skating
 Eddie Guerrero, 38 (2005), wrestling
 Frank Hayes, 22 (1923), horse racing
 Thomas Herrion, 23 (2005), Amer. football
 Cătălin Hîldan, 24 (2000), soccer
 Dixie Howell, 40 (1960), baseball
 Chuck Hughes, 28 (1971), Amer. football
 Flo Hyman, 31 (1986), volleyball
 Endurance Idahor, 25 (2010), soccer
 Robbie James, 40 (1998), soccer
 Daniel Jarque, 26 (2009), soccer
 Cristiano Júnior, 25 (2004), soccer
 Joe Kennedy, 28 (2007), baseball
 Darryl Kile, 33 (2002), baseball
 John Kirkby, 23 (1953), soccer
 Michael Klein, 33 (1993), soccer
 György Kolonics, 36 (2008), canoeing
 Wayne Larkin, 29 (1968), ice hockey
 Rauli Levonen, 28 (1981), ice hockey
 Reggie Lewis, 27 (1993), basketball
 José Lima, 37 (2010), baseball
 David Longhurst, 25 (1990), soccer
 Nikola Mantov, 23 (1973), soccer
 Pete Maravich, 40 (1988), basketball
 Alex Marques, 20 (2013), soccer
 Jesse Marunde, 27 (2007), weightlifting
 Scott Mason, 28 (2005), cricket
 Naoki Matsuda, 34 (2011), soccer
 Stan Mauldin, 27 (1948), Amer. football
 Cormac McAnallen, 24 (2004), Gaelic football
 Conrad McRae, 29 (2000), basketball
 Fab Melo, 26 (2017), basketball
 Nilton Pereira Mendes, 30 (2006), soccer
 Igor Misko, 23 (2010), ice hockey
 Stéphane Morin, 29 (1998), ice hockey
 Piermario Morosini, 25 (2012), soccer
 Carl Morton, 39 (1983), baseball
 Damien Nash, 24 (2007), Amer. football
 Frederiek Nolf, 21 (2009), cycling
 Chaswe Nsofwa, 28 (2007), soccer
 Gábor Ocskay, 33 (2009), ice hockey
 Phil O'Donnell, 35 (2007), soccer
 Samuel Okwaraji, 25 (1989), soccer
 David Oniya, 30 (2015), soccer
 Alen Pamić, 23 (2013), soccer
 Pavão, 26 (1973), soccer
 Bruno Pezzey, 39 (1994), soccer
 Pheidippides, c. 40 (490 BC), marathon
 Antonio Puerta, 22 (2007), soccer
 Petar Radaković, 29 (1966), soccer
 Mickey Renaud, 19 (2008), ice hockey
 Bernardo Ribeiro, 26 (2016), soccer
 Darcy Robinson, 26 (2007), ice hockey
 Brad Rone, 34 (2003), boxing
 Omar Sahnoun, 24 (1980), soccer
 Serginho, 30 (2004), soccer
 Ryan Shay, 28 (2007), marathon
 Dave Sparks, 26 (1954), Amer. football
 Cheick Tioté, 30 (2017), soccer
 Robert Traylor, 34 (2011), basketball
 Zeke Upshaw, 26 (2018), basketball
 Luciano Vendemini, 24 (1977), basketball
 Ginty Vrede, 22 (2008), kickboxing
 Frank Warfield, 35 (1932), baseball
 Chandler Williams, 27 (2013), Amer. football
 David "Soldier" Wilson, 23 (1906), soccer
 Sergejs Žoltoks, 31 (2004), ice hockey

See also
 Cardiac Risk in the Young (UK charity)
 Lists of sportspeople who died during their careers

References

Deaths in sport
Heart diseases
Lists of people by cause of death
Sportspeople by cause of death